The 1940–41 Duke Blue Devils men's basketball team represented Duke University during the 1940–41 men's college basketball season. The head coach was Eddie Cameron, coaching his 13th season with the Blue Devils. The team finished with an overall record of 14–8.

References 

Duke Blue Devils men's basketball seasons
Duke
1940 in sports in North Carolina
1941 in sports in North Carolina